Ruslan Maynov (born 15 November 1976) is a Bulgarian actor and singer of Bessarabian Bulgarian origin.

Biography
Maynov was born in Izmail in the region of Bessarabia, Ukrainian SSR (now Ukraine) to a Bulgarian family. He moved to Bulgaria in 1994; he graduated from NATFIZ in 1998 and started working with Slavi Trifonov on his TV shows Hashove and Slavi's Show. He was also a host of Gospodari na efira. In 2007, he joined up with fellow actors Lyubomir Neykov, Krastyo Lafazanov and Hristo Garbov and launched Komitsite (The Comedians), a stand-up comedy show aired on bTV on Friday evening.

Television aside, Maynov has also participated in a number of theatrical plays and has released five music albums.

Discography:
 Руслан Mъйнов Пее Любими Руски Песни (2014)
 Българско Хоро (2017)

References

1976 births
Living people
Bessarabian Bulgarians
Bulgarian male television actors
Bulgarian male stage actors
21st-century Bulgarian male singers
Bulgarian folk-pop singers
People from Izmail
21st-century Bulgarian male actors